Malaysia is a federal constitutional monarchy located in Southeast Asia. It is a relatively state-oriented and newly industrialised market economy. 

The state plays a significant but declining role in guiding economic activity through macroeconomic plans. In 2014, Malaysia's economy grew 6%, the second highest growth in ASEAN behind Philippines' growth of 6.1%. The economy of Malaysia (GDP PPP) in 2014 was $746.821 billion, the third largest in ASEAN behind Indonesia and Thailand and the 28th largest in the world.

For further information on the types of business entities in this country and their abbreviations, see "Business entities in Malaysia".

Largest firms 

This list shows firms in the Fortune Global 500, which ranks firms by total revenues reported before 31 March 2017. Only the top five firms (if available) are included as a sample.

Notable firms 
This list includes notable companies with primary headquarters located in the country. The industry and sector follow the Industry Classification Benchmark taxonomy. Organizations which have ceased operations are included and noted as defunct.

See also 
Companies Commission of Malaysia
Economy of Malaysia
 Kuala Lumpur Composite Index

References

Malaysia